Owen McInerney (1826 – May 9, 1890) was an Irish-born merchant and political figure in New Brunswick, Canada. He represented Kent County in the Legislative Assembly of New Brunswick from 1866 to 1869.

He was born in County Longford, the son of Francis McInerney, and came to Chatham as an infant. He married Mary McAuley and then Jane Burns after his first wife's death. He served as a captain in the county militia. He was named to the Legislative Council of New Brunswick in 1869. McInerney ran unsuccessfully for a seat in the House of Commons in 1867.

His son George Valentine later served in the House of Commons.

References 
The Canadian parliamentary companion for 1875, HJ Morgan

External links 
The Irish In Early New Brunswick, Irish Canadian Cultural Association of New Brunswick

1826 births
1917 deaths
Members of the Legislative Assembly of New Brunswick
Members of the Legislative Council of New Brunswick
Candidates in the 1867 Canadian federal election
Irish emigrants to pre-Confederation New Brunswick